Pothinamallayya Palem or PM Palem, is a residential neighbourhood within Madhurawada situated in Visakhapatnam city in the Indian state of Andhra Pradesh. It is located in the Greater Visakhapatnam Municipal Corporation area.  It is located to the north of Visakhapatnam city on National Highway 16 (NH16)  to Srikakulam. This place is well connected to other parts of the city such as Asilmetta and Maddilapalem. The only international cricket stadium in Andhra Pradesh (Dr. Y.S. Rajasekhara Reddy ACA-VDCA Cricket Stadium) is located here.

Nearby Localities
Yendada ( 4 km ), Rushikonda ( 7 km ), Kommadi ( 7 km ), Sagar Nagar ( 6 km ) are the nearby Localities to Pothinamallayya Palem.

Transport
PM Palem is well connected to Gurudwara Junction (City Bus Stop), Visakhapatnam APSRTC Bus Station, NAD X Road, Maddilapalem and APSRTC runs a number of buses from major cities to here.

APSRTC routes

Commerce 
This area is a chosen location for real estate investors.

References

Neighbourhoods in Visakhapatnam